Amy Yuratovac (born December 7, 1982) is an American former professional boxer who competed from 2005 to 2009 and challenged for the WBA and WBC female welterweight titles in 2009.

Professional career
Yuratovac debuted in July 2005 and won her first five bouts by technical knockout (TKO). She then suffered her first loss to Christy Martin but rebounded with a win over Jasmine Davis. After Yuratovac unsuccessfully challenged Mia St. John for the vacant WBC International female welterweight title in June 2008, Cecilia Brækhus defeated Yuratovac to retain her WBA and WBC world female welterweight titles in May 2009.

Professional boxing record

External links

1982 births
Living people
American women boxers
Welterweight boxers
21st-century American women